Birc Ebdalo or Burj Abdallah is a village in northern Syria, administratively part of the Aleppo Governorate, located northwest of Aleppo. Nearby localities include Basouta and Afrin to the north, Kimar to the northeast, Nubl to the east, Barad to the southeast, Darat Izza to the south and Jindires to the west. According to the Syria Central Bureau of Statistics (CBS), Burj Abdullah had a population of 1,224 in the 2004 census. On March 20, 2018, the village came under the control of the Syrian National Army.

References

Populated places in Afrin District
Villages in Aleppo Governorate